Luke Richard Currie (born 24 July 1981) is an Australian jockey. 

Currie has ridden in Singapore, Malaysia and Mauritius, and is now based in Hong Kong. His most prestigious victories are the 2003 Group 1 Toorak Handicap riding Roman Arch, 2002 VRC Queen Elizabeth Stakes, where he rode Makybe Diva, and the 2012 Group 2 Australia Stakes riding Sea Lord (Street Cry) for trainer Stephen Brown. As of late June 2021, he has ridden 1,358 winners, including 13 in Group One races.

References

1981 births
Living people
Australian jockeys
Place of birth missing (living people)